Rik Daniëls (born 24 October 1962) is a Belgian television director. He is best known for directing the Belgian TV series Alle maten with Vincent Rouffaer since 1998 and the 1995 series Thuis. He also worked as the leading director on the top series Flikken.

External links
 

Flemish television directors
1962 births
Living people
Place of birth missing (living people)
20th-century Belgian people